Shorea symingtonii (also called white meranti) is a species of plant in the family Dipterocarpaceae. It is endemic to Sabah in Borneo.

References

symingtonii
Endemic flora of Borneo
Trees of Borneo
Flora of Sabah
Taxonomy articles created by Polbot